Westport station (also informally known as Saugatuck station) is a commuter rail stop on the Metro-North Railroad's New Haven Line, located in Westport, Connecticut. It is located in the center of the Saugatuck section of town, a few miles south of downtown Westport, and is one of two stations serving Westport. The station was named Westport & Saugatuck in timetables of the New Haven Railroad and the early years of its corporate successor, Penn Central.

Station layout
The station has two high-level side platforms. The northern platform is nine cars long, and the southern one is ten cars long. The northern platform, adjacent to Track 3, is generally used by westbound trains. The southern platform, adjacent to Track 4, is generally used by eastbound trains. The New Haven Line has four tracks at this location. The two inner tracks, not adjacent to either platform, are used only by express trains.

The station has 1,454 parking spaces, 1,126 of them owned by the state. The ticket office at the station was closed on July 7, 2010 and tickets must be purchased from vending machines adjacent to the platforms.

Bibliography

References

External links

 Bureau of Public Transportation of the Connecticut Department of Transportation, "Condition Inspection for the Westport Station" report dated December 2006
 entrance from Google Maps Street View
 http://www.ct.gov/dot/lib/dot/documents/dpt/1_Station_Inspection_Summary_Report.pdf

Metro-North Railroad stations in Connecticut
Stations on the Northeast Corridor
Stations along New York, New Haven and Hartford Railroad lines
Railroad stations in Fairfield County, Connecticut
Buildings and structures in Westport, Connecticut
Railway stations in the United States opened in 1848
1848 establishments in Connecticut